Thomas Porcher (born 5 July 1977) is a French economist and author. He is a member of the heterodox association of economists called Économistes atterrés.

Early life and education 
Thomas Porcher's father was a management teacher of Vietnamese origin and his mother a seamstress of Italian origin. He was a black belt of karaté at 16 years old.

After his baccalauréat, Porcher obtained a licence, then a doctorate on Economics at the Pantheon-Sorbonne University.

Career 
Thomas Porcher is an associate professor of Economics at the Paris School of Business.

He has published more than ten books. His book Treaty of Heretic Economy (released in 2018) is a bestseller in France that has sold more than 50,000 copies. His essay The neglected (released in February 2020) makes "a rapid entry into the best sales. Printed in 13,000 copies, it was reprinted in 2000 four days after its release."

Thomas Porcher is regularly invited to French medias. The RePEc collective ranks him 38th most followed economist in the world on Twitter on 1068 identified economists.

Political career 
In 2018, Porcher along with Raphaël Glucksmann funded and supported the centre-left political party Place Publique ("Public Place").

On 16 March 2019, Place Publique and the Socialist Party announced that they would present a joint list of candidates for the European Parliament election, with Raphaël Glucksmann as the head of the list. Porcher left the party the same day, denouncing what he called a "list of apparatchiks".

Personal life 
He was in a relationship with actress Elodie Yung for 14 years. Since 2011, he has been with lawyer Sarah Salesse, daughter of Yves Salesse, figure of the unionism in France.

Publications 
 2009, Un baril de pétrole contre 100 mensonges, Res publica éditions 
 2009, Reprise ou Re-crise ?, Res publica éditions 
 2010, Recettes pétrolières et financement de la lutte contre la pauvreté: le cas de la République du Congo, Éditions universitaires européennes 
 2012, L'indécence précède l'essence - Enquête sur un Total scandale, Max Milo Éditions 
 2013, Le Mirage du gaz de schiste, Max Milo Éditions 
 2014, TAFTA : l'accord du plus fort, Max Milo Éditions 
 2015, 20 idées reçues sur l'énergie (with R.H. Boroumand, S. Goutte), De Boeck  
 2015, Le Déni climatique (with H. Landes), Max Milo Éditions 
 2016, Introduction inquiète à la Macron-économie (with F. Farah), Les Petits matins 
 2016, Sortir de l'impasse : appel des 138 économistes (collective work), Les liens qui libèrent 
 2017, La politique est à nous (collective work), Robert Laffont 
 2018, Traité d'économie hérétique : en finir avec le discours dominant, Fayard 
 2018, Macron : un mauvais tournant (Les économistes atterrés avec H. Sterdyniak, D. Cayla, A. Jatteau, D. Lang, P. Légé, C. Mathieu, T. Porcher, C. Ramaux, G. Rotillon), Les liens qui libèrent  
2020 Les délaissés. Comment transformer un bloc divisé en force majoritaire, Fayard,

References 

1977 births
Living people
20th-century French essayists
21st-century French essayists
French economists
Place Publique politicians